Carex retrofracta is a tussock-forming perennial in the family Cyperaceae. It is native to eastern parts of Asia.

See also
 List of Carex species

References

retrofracta
Plants described in 1929
Taxa named by Georg Kükenthal
Flora of Taiwan
Flora of China